The Piper oilfield  is a substantial North Sea oilfield covering 30.1 km2 (11½ sq. mi.).  It lies roughly halfway between Aberdeen and Bergen, at the eastern end of the Moray Firth basin. Oil extracted from it is piped to Scotland, where it is stabilised at an oil plant on the island of Flotta, in the Orkney archipelago, while gas is shipped via the Frigg gas pipeline.  In June 1975, the Piper Alpha oil platform was placed over the field in 144 metres (79 fathoms) of water, secured in place by 24 piles extending 116 metres (63 fathoms) beneath the seabed. The platform was designed for simultaneous drilling and production. Piper Alpha was the site of one of the world's worst oil platform disasters when it was destroyed by an explosion in 1988, with the loss of 167 lives.  Piper Bravo was installed in 1992.  Talisman Energy acquired a controlling interest in 2000.

Occidental Petroleum Corp., Getty Oil (Britain) Ltd., Thomson North Sea Ltd., and Allied Chemical (North Sea) Ltd., that later transformed into the OPCAL joint venture, obtained an oil exploration licence in 1972 and discovered the Piper oilfield in early 1973 after seismically mapping the area. A gas recovery module was installed by 1980. OPCAL built the Flotta oil terminal in the Orkney Islands to receive and process oil from the Piper, Claymore and Tartan fields, each with its own platform. The Tartan field also fed oil to Claymore and then onto the main line to Flotta.

Geology
The field consists of three folded, tilted blocks on the northern edge of the Witch Ground Graben. Production is from the Upper Jurassic Piper Sandstone, a sandstone shelf with a thickness up to 142 metres (465') and Oil-water contact ranging in depths from 2195 to 2804 metres (7201' to 9200') under the sea. Piper oil most likely originated in the Kimmeridge Shale.

See also
Energy policy of the United Kingdom
Energy use and conservation in the United Kingdom

References

External links
 Piper Alpha: Lessons Learnt, 2008
 Talisman's Piper 'B' Platform

North Sea oil fields
Oil fields of Scotland